is an anime series based on the role-playing physics game of the same name developed by XFLAG for iOS and Android platforms. An anime film adaptation titled Monster Strike The Movie was released on December 10, 2016. A second anime film, titled Monster Strike The Movie: Sora no Kanata, was released on October 5, 2018 in Japan. A third film Monster Strike the Movie: Lucifer - Zetsubō no Yoake was slated to be released in June 2020, but was delayed to November 6, 2020 due to the COVID-19 pandemic.

The series' ending theme is a cover of Queen's "We Will Rock You" performed by Japanese vocalist Gloria. After a break, the ending theme switched to several songs by White Ash: "Strike", "Knock On Doors In You", "Mad T.Party (1865-2016)", and "Drop", all of which are from the band's August 17, 2016, EP Quest, including "Monster", a song composed for the MS Grand Prix 2016 Championship.

A second season of Monster Strike has been announced and premiered on April 1, 2017. The plot of the second season revolves around Ren, Aoi, Akira, Minami, and a new American transfer student named Mana dealing with problems caused by monsters manifesting in real life outside of the Monster Strike game. The season was split into two parts, with Monster Strike The Animation: The Fading Cosmos premiering on October 7, 2017.

The Monster Strike anime got its first spin-off on May 3, 2017 with the A Rhapsody Called Lucy -The Very First Song- OVA episode. This lead into the MSonic! D'Artagnyan's Rise to Fame special mini-series that premiered on June 14, 2017. Both A Rhapsody Called Lucy and MSonic! are set in a separate continuity from the main Monster Strike anime.

Plot
Ren Homura, a middle school student who moves back to his hometown with his mother and sister, but he apparently cannot remember much of his life there. After having to get his cellphone repaired, he finds that the repairman installed Monster Strike onto it, and he later is attacked by a man who forces him into a real life game of Monster Strike, summoning a monster from within the game to attack Ren. Ren manages to summon a monster of his own, the diminutive dragon Oragon, and with help from his classmate Aoi Mizusawa, as well as an alter ego awoken by his own missing memories, Ren defeats the man's monster, seemingly freeing him from the control of an evil entity. This brings Ren into the world of the town's Monster Strike Stadium leagues, where people play Monster Strike in what appears to be real life but are advanced holograms, as well as Aoi's desire to reunite her friends Akira Kagetsuki and Minami Wakaba into becoming a team of Monster Strike players. However, Akira will not play on a team because Ren is nothing like their former fourth member Haruma, and the air-headed Minami has become possessed by the same evil presence that forced other people to attack Ren and Aoi.

Characters

Main characters
 
The protagonist. He cannot seem to remember anything about his life in his old town, but when his memories temporarily resurface he becomes an ace Monster Strike player. His signature monsters are Oragon,  and  who Transcends into .
 
Ren's classmate. After helping Ren out in his first real world Monster Strike battle, she begins to plan him joining her old Monster Strike team, having already given him a special ring that allows him to properly control the apparently real monsters.
 
Another of Ren's classmates, and one of Aoi's now former teammates at playing Monster Strike competitively. He is a perfectionist who cannot see Ren as replacing their former fourth teammate Haruma.
 
Another of Ren's classmates and one of Aoi's former Monster Strike teammates. She is very airheaded, and is an otaku who often mimics and references popular anime and manga. When she is introduced, she is under the control of the mysterious entity possessing people to lead to real life Monster Strike matches.
 
A monster that Ren summons from his phone after Monster Strike is installed and he is facing off against a man possessed by the evil entity. Oragon claims to be the Prince of the Monster World who has come to the human world to become stronger, but most people believe he is simply a creation of the game.
 
Haruma was previously the fourth member of Aoi, Minami, and Akira's Monster Strike team until he moved out of Kaminohara for reasons they cannot remember. After Ren defeats Doom, it is hinted that Haruma is somehow responsible for his lost memories, as well as the memories of the others. They track Haruma down in Shibuya, only to be easily defeated in Monster Strike, resulting in his demand that they become the top players in Kaminohara before speaking to him, again.
    (Season 2)
A Transfer Student from America becomes friends with the Main Cast and learns about Monster Strike Game, even obtaining her own ring and Partner.

Supporting characters
 
A student from another homeroom in Ren and Aoi's middle school who appears to inform them about Minami's odd behavior. He seems to be aware of the mysterious figures leading people to be possessed. He is secretly the number 1 player in all of Kaminohara, and is possessed by the War God .
 
Kaminohara Middle School's student council president. She is the 4th ranked MS player in the area and challenges the recently-formed MS Club members to determine the fate of their club.
 
A jock at Kaminohara Middle School who is turned on by being put down by women.
 
A student at Kaminohara Middle School who is obsessed with Minami's family cafe. She even goes so far as to take a part time job at a rival chain store and provide bad service to get people to go to the Wakaba family store. She is the 2nd ranked MS player and uses .
 
One of Haruma's new MS teammates. She is dressed in Harajuku fashion. She uses the monster .
 
One of Haruma's new teammates. She claims to have psychic powers that allow her to accurately predict the outcomes of her MS matches and often gets nosebleeds. Her monster is  who slide Evolves into .
 
Haruma's other MS teammate. He likes to show off his muscles, and believes a well-developed upper body is key to victory.

Other characters
 
Genma, otherwise known as "K", is the first champion of Kaminohara's MS Colosseum. He lures Ren and his friends to the colosseum to battle , who transforms into the corrupted . Genma is also possessed by one of the War Gods, .
 
Ren's little sister.
 
Ren's mother.
 
Minami's father. He runs the family café with Minami after. He dresses like a soldier but his personality far from tough and imposing as his appearance would suggest.
 
A mysterious young woman Ren and his friends encounter on their trip to Okinawa. She is actually a monster who has been captured by the American military during their tests on weaponizing Monster Strike.
 
A lieutenant in the U.S. Navy. She is Dolph's friend's daughter who shows Ren, Aoi, Minami, and Akira around Okinawa. She is secretly trying to free Lyra Kiskill from her superiors in the Navy.
 
An American military officer working with the company NADTDcom to find a way to control Monster Strike monsters for the American military's gain. He uses a powerful monster named Oceanus.

Episodes

Monster Strike (2016)

Monster Strike 2 (2017)

Monster Strike 3 (2018-19)

Films
There have been two anime films based on the Monster Strike anime series.

Monster Strike The Movie

An anime film adaptation titled Monster Strike The Movie was released on December 10, 2016.

Monster Strike The Movie: Sora no Kanata
A second anime film adaptation titled Monster Strike The Movie: Sora no Kanata was released on October 5, 2018. Studio Orange animated the film.

Monster Strike the Movie: Lucifer - Zetsubō no Yoake
A third anime film adaptation title Monster Strike the Movie: Lucifer - Zetsubō no Yoake was slated to be released in June 2020, but was pushed to November 6, 2020 due to the COVID-19 pandemic.

Reception
On YouTube, the anime series had been watched 100million times by August 2016, and over 200million times as of June 2017.

Monster Strike The Movie grossed  at the Japanese box office. The second film, Sora no Kanata, has grossed  in Japan as of October 16, 2018. Both films have grossed a combined  at the Japanese box office as of October 16, 2018.

Notes

References

External links

2015 anime ONAs
2015 web series debuts
Japanese animated web series
Anime based on video games
Anime postponed due to the COVID-19 pandemic
Connect (studio)
Mass media franchises
Orange (animation studio)
Fiction about robots
Sanzigen
Studio Hibari
Ultra Super Pictures
Yokohama Animation Laboratory
Anime film and television articles using incorrect naming style